Philipsburg is the main town and capital of the country of Sint Maarten. The town is on a narrow stretch of land between Great Bay and the Great Salt Pond. It functions as the commercial center of Saint Martin island, whereof Sint Maarten encompasses the southern half. , it has 1,894 inhabitants.

History
Philipsburg was founded in 1763 by John Philips, a Scottish captain in the Dutch navy; the settlement soon became a centre of international trade. Two historic forts bear witness to Philipsburg's strategic importance in St. Maarten's history: Fort Amsterdam and Fort Willem.

Tourism

The main shopping district, Front Street, is in the heart of the city. The city also has a port that is visited by many cruise liners.

Transport

Princess Juliana International Airport

World-famous for its close photographs of landing aircraft, Princess Juliana International Airport (IATA: SXM, ICAO: TNCM), west of Philipsburg, has become a tourist destination in its own right. Jet blast from departing aircraft is another 'attraction' as it creates artificial waves. However, jet blast is physically hazardous so viewers need to exercise caution; local authorities placed a warning on the airport's fence to alert people to the dangers of jet blast.

Education
Schools include:
Oranje School (public primary)
Sr. Borgia Primary (subsidized primary)
St. Joseph Primary (subsidized primary)
Sundial School (subsidized secondary)

Philipsburg Jubilee Library is in Philipsburg.

Climate
Philipsburg has a tropical savanna climate (Köppen Aw), and is drier than most parts of the northeastern Caribbean due to a rain shadow from the island's mountains, drying the northeast trade winds. The driest months are from January to July, and the wettest from September to November, when hurricanes are a frequent occurrence in the region.

See also
 List of Designated Monuments in Philipsburg

References

External links 

Philipsburg Jubilee Library, Public Library of St. Maarten

	

 
Populated places in Sint Maarten
Capitals in the Caribbean
Populated places established in 1763
1763 establishments in North America